Eddy Dempsey is an American politician serving as a member of the Oklahoma House of Representatives from the 1st district. Elected in November 2020, he assumed office on January 11, 2021.

Early life and education 
Dempsey is a native of Valliant, Oklahoma. After studying mathematics at Northeastern Oklahoma A&M College for one year, he earned a Bachelor of Arts degree in parks and recreation and leisure studies from Southeastern Oklahoma State University.

Career 
After graduating from college, Dempsey worked as an I&E technician, pipe-fitter, and gas and chemical technician. From 2013 to 2019, he was a field representative for Congressman Markwayne Mullin. Dempsey also owns a small farm in Valliant. He was elected to the Oklahoma House of Representatives in November 2020 and assumed office on January 11, 2021.

References 

Living people
People from McCurtain County, Oklahoma
Southeastern Oklahoma State University alumni
Republican Party members of the Oklahoma House of Representatives
Year of birth missing (living people)